Milan Mišůn  (born 21 February 1990) is a Czech footballer who currently plays as a left back or centre back for Baník Sokolov in the Czech 2. Liga.

Club career

FK Příbram
Mišůn played for FK Příbram, where he made 24 appearances and scored two goals.

Celtic
Mišůn's signed for Scottish Premier League side Celtic in December 2008 after they fought off competition from AC Milan and Copenhagen Mišůn was given the number 15 shirt and was eligible to play for Celtic from 1 January 2009. He was an unused substitute in a 4–2 loss to Aberdeen on 18 January 2009.

Dundee
Mišůn was loaned out for a month to Scottish First Division side Dundee on 17 September 2010 and made his debut the following weekend in a 0–0 draw against Raith Rovers. He returned to Celtic after Dundee fell into administration.

Return to Celtic
After returning to Celtic, on 28 January 2011 Mišůn apparently joined League One side Swindon Town for an undisclosed fee - however, it was later revealed he had not officially signed a contract.

Viktoria Plzeň
After joining Viktoria Plzeň, Mišůn was linked with a move to Sheffield United in July 2012.

International career
Mišůn was a member of the Czech under-19 team and made six appearances, his last being in a 5–1 win against Estonia on 26 May 2009. He scored one goal, a shot from 25 yards against Spain on 23 May 2009. He has played at under-20 level for his country.

References

External links

1990 births
Living people
Sportspeople from Příbram
Czech footballers
Czech Republic youth international footballers
Association football defenders
Czech First League players
1. FK Příbram players
FC Viktoria Plzeň players
FK Jablonec players
Celtic F.C. players
Dundee F.C. players
Czech expatriate footballers
Expatriate footballers in Scotland
Swindon Town F.C. players